Dystopia is the third and final studio album by Dystopia. It was recorded in 2004-2005 and was released in February 2008 on Life is Abuse. The album was recorded between the years 2004 and 2005, and was released shortly after the band broke up. Lyrically, the album focuses on cynicism and paranoia developed during the internet era.

Track listing

Personnel
Todd Kiessler - bass
Dino Sommese - vocals, drums
Matt Parrillo - guitar, vocals, artwork, sampler
Tardon Featherhead - mastering
Hans-Jürgen Burkard - photography
Lord Snowdon - photography
Nicolas Lampert- artwork
Ajana - artwork
Abhor KUK - typography
Mourn - typography
Vomit BDF - typography
Tim Green - recording

References

2008 albums
Dystopia (band) albums